Yuliya Drozhzhina (born March 1, 1990, Zarinsk, Altai Krai) is a Russian political figure and a deputy of the 8th State Duma. 

From 2014 to 2016, Drozhzhina was the head of the organizational department of the Russian National Youth Organization "Russian Students' Teams". In 2016, she was appointed head of the Moscow branch of the organization. In 2018, she coordinated volunteers during the Vladimir Putin's presidential campaign. 

Since 2021, she has served as a deputy of the 8th State Duma from the Moscow constituency. She ran with the United Russia. Initially, Yulia Drozhzhina did not make it to the party lists. However, three people before her rejected their mandates, and she received the place on October 7. Drozhzhina became the last registered deputy of the 8th State Duma.

She is one of the members of the State Duma the United States Treasury sanctioned on 24 March 2022 in response to the 2022 Russian invasion of Ukraine.

References

1990 births
Living people
People from Altai Krai
United Russia politicians
Eighth convocation members of the State Duma (Russian Federation)
Russian individuals subject to the U.S. Department of the Treasury sanctions
Altai State Technical University alumni